Allan Reginald McEvey (1919–1996) was a schoolteacher before becoming Curator of Ornithology at the National Museum of Victoria in Melbourne, Australia.  In 1962–63 he participated in the first of the Harold Hall Australian ornithological collecting expeditions.  He was President of the Royal Australasian Ornithologists Union (RAOU) in 1968–1969, a critical period in its history.  He was elected a Fellow of the RAOU in 1980.

References
 Anon. (1980). RAOU Fellow: Citation. Allan Reginald McEvey. Emu 80: 244.
 Robin, Libby. (2001). The Flight of the Emu: a hundred years of Australian ornithology 1901-2001. Carlton, Vic. Melbourne University Press. 

Australian ornithologists
1919 births
1996 deaths
20th-century Australian zoologists
Australian schoolteachers